Maureen Feduniak is an American poker player from Las Vegas, Nevada.

Poker career
Feduniak has been a veteran of the live poker tournament circuit going back to at least the late 1990s. Her biggest career cash is $108,564, which came in the 2006 World Series of Poker $1,500 No Limit Hold'em event, where she finished runner-up to Anders Henriksson. She has 12 career cashes and one final table appearance at the World Series of Poker.

As of 2018, Feduniak's lifetime poker winnings exceed $504,000.

Personal life
Maureen is married to fellow poker player Bob Feduniak. The couple resides in Las Vegas.

References

Living people
American poker players
Female poker players
People from Las Vegas
Year of birth missing (living people)